Umut is a Turkish gender neutral given name meaning hope. Notable people named Umut include:

 Umut Akkoyun (born 2000), Turkish tennis player
 Umut apa (fl. 1991–2005), renowned charismatic healer from Kazakhstan
 Umut Aral (born 1976), Turkish film director, producer, and screenwriter
 Umut Atakişi (born 1981), Turkish Chess Champion
 Umut Bozok (born 1996), French-born Turkish footballer 
 Umut Bulut (born 1983), Turkish footballer
 Umut Gündoğan (born 1990), Turkish footballer
 Umut Güneş (born 2000), Turkish footballer
 Umut A. Gurkan, Turkish–American mechanical and biomedical engineer
 Umut Güzelses (born 1987), Turkish-Israeli soccer player
 Umut Meraş (born 1995), Turkish footballer
 Umut Nayir (born 1993), Turkish footballer
 Umut Oran (born 1962), Turkish textile manufacturer and politician
 Umut Özkirimli (born 1970), Turkish political scientist
 Umut Shayakhmetova (born 1969), Kazakh businesswoman
 Umut Sönmez (born 1993), Azerbaijani footballer
 Umut Sözen (born 1990), Turkish footballer
 Umut Taniş (born 2004), Turkish footballer

See also
 Ümit, a Turkish given name and surname

References 

Turkish unisex given names